Septoria platanifolia is a fungal plant pathogen infecting plane trees.

External links
Index Fungorum
USDA ARS Fungal Database

platanifolia
Fungal tree pathogens and diseases
Fungi described in 1878